The 1998 Seattle Seahawks season was the franchise's 23rd season in the National Football League (NFL), the 23rd playing their home games at the Kingdome, and the fourth and final under head coach head coach Dennis Erickson. They matched  their 8–8 record from 1997, but a late-season loss to the New York Jets came due to a controversial call when Jets quarterback Vinny Testaverde ran in a touchdown but was downed short of the goalline yet the play was ruled a touchdown; the loss helped knock Seattle out of the playoffs for the tenth consecutive season.

Offseason

NFL draft

Undrafted free agents

Personnel

Staff

Final roster

     Starters in bold.
 (*) Denotes players that were selected for the 1999 Pro Bowl.

Schedule

Preseason

Source: Seahawks Media Guides

Regular season
Divisional matchups have the AFC West playing the NFC East.

Bold indicates division opponents.
Source: 1998 NFL season results

Standings

Game summaries

Preseason

Week P1: at Dallas Cowboys

Week P2: vs. Indianapolis Colts

Week P3: vs. San Francisco 49ers

Week P4: at Arizona Cardinals

Week P5: vs. San Francisco 49ers

Regular season

Week 1: at Philadelphia Eagles

Week 2: vs. Arizona Cardinals

Week 3: vs. Washington Redskins

Week 4: at Pittsburgh Steelers

Week 5: at Kansas City Chiefs

Week 6: vs. Denver Broncos

Week 8: at San Diego Chargers

Week 9: vs. Oakland Raiders

Week 10: vs. Kansas City Chiefs

Week 11: at Oakland Raiders

Week 12: at Dallas Cowboys

Week 13: vs. Tennessee Oilers

Week 14: at New York Jets

Vinny Testaverde's controversial touchdown on fourth down from the five-yard line with 20 seconds remaining gave the Jets the victory.  Replays showed that Testaverde's helmet crossed the goal line, but not the ball.  This play is widely attributed as being responsible for bringing back instant replay to the NFL in 1999.

Week 15: vs. San Diego Chargers

Week 16: vs. Indianapolis Colts

Week 17 at Denver Broncos

Awards and records

The 1998 Seahawks hold the record for most defensive touchdowns in a season, with 10 (as of the 2007 NFL Season).
 In 2012 the Chicago Bears tied the record.

Milestones

References

External links
 Seahawks draft history at NFL.com
 1998 NFL season results at NFL.com

Seattle
Seattle Seahawks seasons
Seattle